Screen Test is a children's game show that aired on BBC1 from 18 November 1970 to 20 December 1984. It was first hosted by Michael Rodd from 1970 to 1979, then by Brian Trueman from 1979 to 1983 and finally by Mark Curry in 1984. It involved its contestants seeing clips from films, and then being asked questions about the films to test their memories of them.

The theme music was  "Marching There and Back" by Syd Dale.

Transmissions

Series

Calling Young Film Makers

Specials

References

External links
 
 Screen Test at BFI
 

1970 British television series debuts
1984 British television series endings
1970s British children's television series
1980s British children's television series
BBC children's television shows
British children's game shows
British children's television series
English-language television shows